Jennifer Madu (born 23 September 1994 in Garland, Texas) is a US born Nigerian track and field sprinter.

She represented Nigeria at the Rio 2016 Summer Olympics. She came 5th in Heat 5 of the 100m with a time of 11.61. She also ran the third leg for the Nigerian's 4 × 100 m relay team.

References

External links 
 
 All-Athletics profile
 Jennifer Madu on Twitter

Living people
1994 births
Nigerian female sprinters
Olympic athletes of Nigeria
Athletes (track and field) at the 2016 Summer Olympics
Athletes (track and field) at the 2018 Commonwealth Games
Commonwealth Games competitors for Nigeria
Olympic female sprinters